William Wyatt (14 April 1893 – 26 December 1989) was a British weightlifter. He competed in the men's lightweight event at the 1924 Summer Olympics.

References

External links
 

1893 births
1989 deaths
British male weightlifters
Olympic weightlifters of Great Britain
Weightlifters at the 1924 Summer Olympics
Place of birth missing
20th-century British people